Prenasalized consonants are phonetic sequences of a nasal and an obstruent (or occasionally a non-nasal sonorant such as ) that behave phonologically like single consonants. The primary reason for considering them to be single consonants, rather than clusters as in English finger or member, lies in their behaviour; however, there may also be phonetic correlates which distinguish prenasalized consonants from clusters. Because of the additional difficulty in both articulation and timing, prenasalized fricatives and sonorants are not as common as prenasalized stops or affricates, and the presence of the former implies the latter.

In most languages, when a prenasalized consonant is described as "voiceless", it is only the oral portion that is voiceless, and the nasal portion is modally voiced. Thus, a language may have "voiced"  and "voiceless" . However, in some Southern Min (including Taiwanese) dialects, voiced consonants are preceded by voiceless prenasalization: . Yeyi has prenasalized ejectives.

(At least in the Chinese case, nasalization, in some dialects, continues in a reduced degree to the vowel, indicating that the consonant is partially denasalized, rather than actually having an oral release.) No language is believed to contrast the two types of consonant, which are distinguished primarily by a difference in timing (a brief nasal followed by longer stop, as opposed to a longer nasal followed by brief stop).

Geographic distribution

Africa 

The Bantu languages are famous for their prenasalized stops (the "nt" in "Bantu" is an example), but similar sounds occur across Africa and around the world. Ghana's politician Kwame Nkrumah had a prenasalized stop in his name, as does the capital of Chad, N'Djamena (African prenasalized stops are often written with apostrophes in Latin script transcription although this may sometimes indicate syllabic nasals instead). The sound  can also be found in approximately 90 languages in Africa.

East Asia 

In Southern Min languages, such as Teochew, prenasalized stops are also found. The prenasalized stops in the southern Min languages evolved from the nasals of Middle Chinese and thus are historically different from the voiced obstruents found in Wu and Xiang languages.

Prenasalized consonants are widely utilized in the Loloish languages of the Lolo–Burmese family, such as Yi and Naxi. The following table illustrates the prenasalized consonants in northern Yi.

The prenasalized stops also occur in several branches of the Hmong–Mien language family of Southern China and Southeast Asia.

In dialects of northern Japan, standard voiced stops are prenasalized, and voiceless stops are voiced. Prenasalized stops are also reconstructed for Old Japanese.

Europe 
Among younger speakers the prenasalization often disappears and in fast speech the voiced stop may be replaced by a fricative.

South America 
The Guaraní language has a set of prenasalized stops which are alternate allophonically with simple nasal continuants; they appear only within a word, to the left of a stressed vowel that is oral.

South Asia 

The Indo-Aryan languages Sinhala and Dhivehi have prenasalized stops.

Sri Lankan Malay has been in contact with Sinhala a long time and has also developed prenasalized stops. The spectrograms on the right show the word gaambar with a prenasalized stops and the word sambal with a sequence of nasal+voiced stop, yet not prenasalized. The difference in the length of the [m] part is clearly visible. The nasal in the prenasalized word is much shorter than the nasal in the other word.

This phonetic information is complemented by phonological evidence: The first vowel in gaambar is lengthened, which only happens in open syllables in Sri Lanka Malay. The syllabification of gaambar must be gaa.mbar then, and the syllabification of sambal sam.bal.

Oceania 

An example of the unitary behavior of prenasalized stops is provided by Fijian. In this language, as in many in Melanesia, there is a series of voiceless stops, and a series of prenasalized stops, but there are no simple voiced stops, . In addition, Fijian allows prenasalized stops at the beginning of a word, but it does not allow other consonant sequences. Thus the prenasalized stops behave like ordinary consonants. In some Oceanic languages, prenasalisation of voiced consonants depends on the environment. For example, in Raga, b and d are prenasalised when the preceding consonant is nasal (noⁿda "ours"), but not elsewhere (gida "us").

When Tok Pisin is spoken by people in Papua New Guinea who have similar phonologies in their languages, voiced consonants are prenasalized. For example, the preposition bilong (from English belong) is pronounced  by many Melanesians. The prenasalization behaves as a phonetic detail of voicing, rather than a separate segment.

Australia 

Prenasalized stops are also found in Australia. The Eastern Arrernte language has both prenasalized stops and prestopped nasals, but does not have any other word-initial consonant clusters. Compare  "good",  "make",  "coolamon".

Transcription
When unambiguous, prenasalized consonants may simply be transcribed  etc. In the IPA, a tie bar may be used to specify that these are single segments: . Another common transcription practice is to make the nasal superscript: . An old convention of the IPA was to mark the nasal as 'short' until the short and the nonsyllabic signs diverged: .

See also 
 Preploded nasal
 List of Latin digraphs#M

References

Sources

Nasal consonants